Sir Jonathan Michael Murphy,  (born 17 June 1958) is a British academic and former senior police officer. Since 2016, he has been Professor of Advanced Policing Studies at Liverpool John Moores University. He was the Chief Constable of Merseyside Police from 2010 to 2016.

Early life and education
Murphy was born on 17 June 1958 in Liverpool, England.
He studied for an LL.B. (Hons) in Law at Liverpool University. In 2001, he earned a diploma in Applied Criminology from Cambridge University (Fitzwilliam College).

Career

Police career
In January 1975, Murphy joined Merseyside Police. He rose to become as Deputy Chief Constable of Merseyside Police and a member of the Association of Chief Police Officers. He then served as Chief Constable of Merseyside Police from 2010 to 2016, before retiring form the police.

Academic career
Murphy held the Fulbright Police Fellowship at the University of California in 1995. In June 2016, he gave the 141st Roscoe Lecture at Liverpool John Moores University. In July 2016, he became Professor of Advanced Policing Studies at Liverpool John Moores University.

Honours
Murphy has been commended on fourteen occasions and was awarded the Queen's Police Medal in the 2007 Birthday Honours. He was knighted in the 2014 Birthday Honours for services to policing.

 He was appointed  as a Deputy Lieutenant for the County of Merseyside on 1 March 2017. This gave him the Post Nominal Letters "DL" for Life.

References

External links
 Merseyside Police's new chief constable Jon Murphy faces up to budget challenge

Chief Constables of Merseyside Police
Living people
People from Liverpool
Knights Bachelor
English recipients of the Queen's Police Medal
Alumni of the University of Liverpool
Alumni of Fitzwilliam College, Cambridge
Deputy Lieutenants of Merseyside
1958 births
Academics of Liverpool John Moores University